Massasoit State Park is a public recreation area located on the southeast side of the city of Taunton, Massachusetts, with some parklands spilling into the adjacent town of Lakeville. The state park encompasses more than 1200 heavily wooded acres that include six lakes and ponds (Lake Rico, Furnace Pond, King's Pond, Middle Pond, Little Bearhole Pond, and Big Bearhole Pond) and numerous cranberry bogs.

Features 

The park has an extensive trail system for walking, hiking, biking, cross-country skiing, and equestrian use. A launch for non-motorized boats is located at the north end of Lake Rico. A fisherman's landing is found on Big Bearhole Pond. Hunting is available on a restricted basis.

2008 lightning strike
A lightning strike in 2008 disabled the park's underground electric system, resulting in the closure of much of the park. Interior sections were reopened to vehicular traffic in 2015, with the reopening of the park's 126-site campground in remaining as a long-term goal, according to officials.
The park later reopened completely in 2018.

References

External links
Massasoit State Park Department of Conservation and Recreation
Massasoit State Park Trail Map Department of Conservation and Recreation

State parks of Massachusetts
Taunton, Massachusetts
Massachusetts natural resources
Parks in Bristol County, Massachusetts